Ribitol, or adonitol, is a crystalline pentose alcohol (C5H12O5) formed by the reduction of ribose. It occurs naturally in the plant Adonis vernalis as well as in the cell walls of some Gram-positive bacteria, in the form of ribitol phosphate, in teichoic acids. It also forms part of the chemical structure of riboflavin and flavin mononucleotide (FMN), which is a nucleotide coenzyme used by many enzymes, the so-called flavoproteins.

References

External links

GMD MS Spectrum
Safety MSDS data 
Biological Magnetic Resonance Data Bank

Sugar alcohols
Orphan drugs